Arthur Linwood Gould (December 19, 1879 – October 17, 1956) was an American educator who served as superintendent of Boston Public Schools from 1937 to 1948.

Early life
Gould was born on December 19, 1879, in Rockland, Massachusetts. He was the second youngest of 9 children born to Henry and Ellen (Keefe) Gould. His father was an Irish immigrant from County Cork who worked in Rockland's shoe factories and his mother was from South Boston. Ellen Gould died in 1893. He graduated from Rockland High School in 1896 and the Bridgewater Normal School in 1900. Gould played shortstop for his high school and college baseball teams as well as for a number of semi-pro teams, including the Rockland Glee Club and the St. Alphonsus Total Abstinence Society of Rockland. He earned three degrees from Boston College (Bachelor of Arts in 1913, Master of Arts in 1914, and Licentiate in 1915).

Career
After graduating from Bridgewater, Gould served as submaster of Hingham High School. In 1902 he was made principal of Abington High School. He also coached the school's baseball and football teams. He moved to the Boston Public Schools in 1906 as submaster of the Lewis School in Roxbury. In 1909 he was transferred to the Martin School. In 1911 he was made principal of the Martin School. In 1913 he was transferred to the Dearborn School in Roxbury. During the 1918–19 school year, Gould developed a plan to allow teachers to present demonstrations before a board of examiners to gain an opportunity for advancement. In 1920 he succeeded Frank Ballou as assistant superintendent. When the city opened its first junior high schools in 1920, Gould was responsible for establishing science courses. In 1937 he succeeded the deceased Patrick T. Campbell as superintendent. He retired on August 31, 1948.

Personal life
Gould never married. While working in Boston, Gould resided at bachelor pad in the city and returned to Rockland on the weekends. Upon his retirement he resided in the Gould family home with his widowed sister. He was a Boston College Eagles football and Boston Red Sox season ticket holder. Gould died on October 17, 1956, at St. Elizabeth's Medical Center in Brighton.

References

1879 births
1956 deaths
20th-century American educators
Boston College alumni
Boston Public Schools superintendents
Bridgewater State Bears baseball players
Bridgewater State University alumni
Educators from Massachusetts
High school football coaches in Massachusetts
People from Rockland, Massachusetts